Sergei Gennadyevich Kaleutin (born 20 June 1986) is a Kyrgyzstani football midfielder. He also holds Russian citizenship.

Career
He made his debut in the Russian Second Division for FC Astrakhan on 17 April 2011 in a game against FC Dynamo Stavropol.

Kaleutin signed for FC Dordoi Bishkek in August 2012, before leaving the club in a year later on 21 August 2013.

Career statistics

International

Statistics accurate as of match played 21 February 2010

References

External links
 

1986 births
Living people
Kyrgyzstani footballers
Kyrgyzstan international footballers
Kyrgyzstani expatriate footballers
Expatriate footballers in Russia
Kyrgyzstani people of Russian descent
FC Dordoi Bishkek players
Place of birth missing (living people)
Footballers at the 2010 Asian Games
Association football midfielders
Asian Games competitors for Kyrgyzstan